Jean Leppien (born Kurt Leppien April 8, 1910 in Lüneburg – October 19, 1991 in Courbevoie at Paris) was a German-French painter.

From 1929, Leppien studied at the Bauhaus Dessau with Josef Albers, Wassily Kandinsky and Paul Klee. He lived in France since 1933, from where he was deported in 1944. After the war he stayed in France as Jean Leppien, where he exhibited at the Salon des Réalités Nouvelles. Leppien is one of the most important representatives of the Geometric abstraction in France. Stylistically, he is close to painters such as Alberto Magnelli, Jean Deyrolle, Michel Seuphor, Emile Gilioli and Aurélie Nemours.

Life 

Kurt Leppien was born in Lüneburg in 1910 as the son of the horsehair cloth manufacturer Jean-Gottfried Leppien. His mother Gertrud Leppien, née Domnich, came from a Hamburg merchant family, her ancestors were manufacturers, merchants, pastors, lawyers and musicians. Leppien spent his youth in Lüneburg and developed an interest in art at an early age. Inspired and guided by painters from Lüneburg such as Ehrich Turlach and Otto Brix, Jean Leppien began to draw and paint continuously as a student at the Lüneburg high school.

Education and apprenticeship 
From 1929 to 1930, Leppien studied at the Bauhaus Dessau, where he attended the preliminary course of Josef Albers and the painting classes of Wassily Kandinsky and Paul Klee. He left Dessau after the departure of Hannes Meyer as director because of the resulting change in the orientation of the Bauhaus.
From 1931 to 1933, he studied photography at the Itten School in Berlin with Lucia Moholy and worked with László Moholy-Nagy (International Building Exhibition 1931).

Emigration to France 
In 1933, Leppien, like his future wife Suzanne Leppien (née Markos-Ney, also a Bauhaus student), emigrated to Paris. To earn his living, he worked on applied graphic (book covers), photomontages, exhibition design ("le grand Garches") and photo coverage.

During the years of war 
In 1939, Leppien was detained in the camp of Marolles, he accepted service in the Foreign Legion and spent almost a year in Algeria and Morocco.

Fearing discovery by the Gestapo, Jean and Suzanne Leppien led a secluded life in Sorgues near Avignon from 1940 to 1944 and survived as vegetable farmers on a small piece of land.

In 1944, Suzanne Leppien was arrested by the Gestapo as a so-called “half-Jewish” woman and deported to Auschwitz concentration camp. Jean Leppien was sentenced to death in Paris for aiding the enemy with weapons and then pardoned to a high prison sentence. He survived the prisons in Bruchsal, Ludwigsburg, Ulm and Donauwörth and was liberated on April 25, 1945 by US troops in Kaisheim. He met Suzanne, who had survived the Auschwitz concentration camp, again in Paris on May 25, 1945.

New beginning after 1945 
For Leppien, the restart in post-war France was the actual beginning of his artistic development, which was nevertheless based on his short period of study at the Dessau Bauhaus. Leppien and his wife Suzanne lived in Nice. In 1946, he was able to begin drawing and painting under difficult material conditions. After that, Roquebrune-Cap-Martin became the center of Leppien’s life and work from the 1950s onwards, alongside Paris.

Leppien established a large number of contacts and friendships with artists of the "art abstrait" (incl. André Bloc, Heinrich Maria Davringhausen, Jean Deyrolle, Adolf Fleischmann, Richard Mortensen, Serge Poliakoff, Hans Reichel, Michel Seuphor, Pierre Soulages, Victor Vasarely) and the critic Herta Wescher. He became a member of the Salon des Réalités Nouvelles, with which he remained connected throughout his life, and exhibited there regularly since 1946.

He took part in various group exhibitions, including one in 1947 at the Galerie Deux Îles in Paris, organized by the art critic and promoter of "art abstrait" Charles Estienne (curator) (Deyrolle, Leppien, Reichel, Sérusier, Springer).

In 1948, Leppien received the Kandinsky Prize as a "prix d'encouragement" alongside the main prize winner Max Bill. He was in close contact with Kandinsky's widow Nina Kandinsky. In 1949, he had his first solo exhibition with Colette Allendy. In 1953, he became a French citizen.

Numerous national and international solo exhibitions and participations in group exhibitions followed. 
In 1987, Leppien was appointed officer of the Ordre des Arts et des Lettres by the French Ministry of Culture.

Jean Leppien died in Courbevoie near Paris in 1991 and was buried in Roquebrune-Cap-Martin.

In his hometown of Lüneburg, a street in the Wienebütteler Weg development area is named after him.

References

Further reading 
  Autobiography of Jean Leppien: 'Ein Blick hinaus. Lebensgeschichte eines Malers.' Klampen, Springe 2004, .
 'Jean Leppien – Vom Bauhaus zum Mittelmeer.' Status-Verlag, Waiblingen 2013, .
 Peter Lufft: 'Jean Leppien', in: 'Das Kunstwerk', ed. 3/4, Baden-Baden 1953.
 Werner Röder, Herbert A. Strauss (Editor), 'International Biographical Dictionary of Central European Emigrés 1933-1945', vol. 2,2. Munich: Saur, 1983 , p. 710.
 Volkhard Knigge, Harry Stein (Editor): 'Franz Ehrlich. Ein Bauhäusler in Widerstand und Konzentrationslager.' (Catalog for the exhibition of the Buchenwald and Mittelbau-Dora Memorials Foundation in collaboration with the Klassik Stiftung Weimar and the Bauhaus Dessau Foundation in the Neues Museum Weimar from August 2, 2009 to October 11, 2009.) Weimar 2009, p. 153 (short biography).

External links 

 Jean Leppien at 'Künste im Exil'
 

1910 births
1991 deaths
20th-century German painters
20th-century German male artists
German male painters
Abstract painters
Bauhaus alumni
Emigrants from Nazi Germany to France
French artists
Officiers of the Ordre des Arts et des Lettres
French abstract artists